Sava Dumitrescu (born January 19, 1927 in Mihăești, Argeș - died September 7, 2019, Iași) was a Romanian pharmacologist and professor at the Grigore T. Popa University of Medicine and Pharmacy in Iaşi, Romania.  He also served as rector of the university. He retired from teaching in 1993, but continued his research activities.

Sava Dumitrescu published the "Handbook of Pharmacology", in 2 volumes (1981 and 1985).  He is also President of the Romanian National Ethics Committee.

References

Medicina nu se poate trata de boala pensionarii Dead Link
Farmacologia romaneasca, de la clasic la modern 

1927 births
Romanian pharmacologists
Romanian scientists
2019 deaths